Dante Cephas is an American football wide receiver for the Penn State Nittany Lions.

Early life and high school
Cephas grew up in Pittsburgh, Pennsylvania and attended Penn Hills High School. He was rated a three-star recruit and committed to play college football at Kent State.

College career
Cephas played in three games and had four receptions for 19 yards as a true freshman before redshirting the season. He caught 11 passes for 136 yards over four games during Kent State's COVID-19-shortened 2020 season. Cephas was named first-team All-Mid-American Conference (MAC) as a redshirt sophomore after catching 82 passes for 1,240 yards and nine touchdowns as a redshirt sophomore. Cephas repeated as a first-team All-MAC selection after finishing the 2022 regular season with 48 receptions for 744 yards and three touchdowns. Following the end of the season he entered the NCAA transfer portal.

On January 15, 2023, Cephas indicated his intent to transfer to Penn State following completion of his undergraduate degree at Kent State.

References

External links
Kent State Golden Flashes bio

Living people
American football wide receivers
Kent State Golden Flashes football players
Penn State Nittany Lions football players
Players of American football from Pennsylvania
Year of birth missing (living people)